Horisawagawa Dam is a gravity dam located in Yamanashi Prefecture in Japan. The dam is used for power production. The catchment area of the dam is 114.5 km2. The dam impounds about   ha of land when full and can store 6 thousand cubic meters of water. The construction of the dam was started on 1924 and completed in 1928.

References

Dams in Yamanashi Prefecture
1928 establishments in Japan